Kelsale cum Carlton is a civil parish in the English county of Suffolk. Situated to the north of Saxmundham, Kelsale cum Carlton is one of the largest parishes in Suffolk by area and includes, in addition to Kelsale and Carlton, villages and hamlets such as Dorley's Corner, Curlew Green, East Green and North Green within its boundaries. The population of the civil parish at the 2011 Census was 990. The parish was formed in 1885.

References

Civil parishes in Suffolk